Dehydrocurvularin is an antimicrobial made by Penicillium.

References

Antimicrobials
Lactones
Heterocyclic compounds with 2 rings
Phenols
Ketones